Tectoridin is an isoflavone, a type of flavonoid. It is the 7-glucoside of tectorigenin and can be isolated from flowers of Pueraria thunbergiana (Leguminosae).

References

GPER agonists
O-methylated isoflavones
Isoflavone glucosides